Fort McMurray—Cold Lake is a federal electoral district in Alberta, Canada, that has been represented in the House of Commons of Canada since 2015. It was created in 2012, mostly from the more urbanized portion of Fort McMurray—Athabasca (78%) combined with a portion of Westlock—St. Paul (22%).

The new riding consists of the Regional Municipality of Wood Buffalo, the city of Cold Lake, and Lac La Biche County. It also contains CFB Cold Lake and most of the Athabasca oil sands.

Members of Parliament

This riding has elected the following members of the House of Commons of Canada:

Election results

References

Alberta federal electoral districts
Cold Lake, Alberta
Fort McMurray